Make Country is a progressive Peruvian political party. Founded in December 2019, the organization is in the process of being registered as a political party to formally participate in the 2026 general election.

References

2019 establishments in Peru
Progressive parties
Political parties established in 2019
Political parties in Peru
Social democratic parties